Egerton House may refer to:

Egerton House, Berkhamsted
Egerton House, Newmarket Heath, stable for race horses and stud in Suffolk
Egerton House Hotel, London
Egerton Grey Country House Hotel, Vale of Glamorgan